The 2018 South Alabama Jaguars football team represented the University of South Alabama in the 2018 NCAA Division I FBS football season. The Jaguars played their home games at Ladd–Peebles Stadium in Mobile, Alabama, and competed in the West Division of the Sun Belt Conference. They were led by first-year head coach Steve Campbell. They finished the season 3–9, 2–6 in Sun Belt play to finish in fourth place in the West Division.

Previous season
The Jaguars finished the 2017 season 4–8, 3–5 in Sun Belt play to finish in a tie for eighth place.

On November 20 following a 52–0 loss to  previously winless Georgia Southern, head coach Joey Jones, the only head coach in South Alabama football history, announced his resignation. He stayed on to coach the final game of the season and finished at South Alabama with a nine-year record of 52–50. On December 7, the school hired Steve Campbell as head coach.

Preseason

Award watch lists
Listed in the order that they were released

Sun Belt coaches poll
On July 19, 2018, the Sun Belt released their preseason coaches poll with the Jaguars predicted to finish in third place in the West Division.

Preseason All-Sun Belt Teams
The Jaguars had five players selected to the preseason all-Sun Belt teams.

Offense

1st team

Jamarius Way – WR

Defense

2nd team

Tyree Turner – DL

Bull Barge – LB

Special teams

1st team

Gavin Patterson – K

Corliss Waitman – P

Schedule

Game summaries

Louisiana Tech

at Oklahoma State

Texas State

at Memphis

at Appalachian State

at Georgia Southern

Alabama State

Troy

at Arkansas State

Louisiana–Monroe

at Louisiana

Coastal Carolina

References

South Alabama
South Alabama Jaguars football seasons
South Alabama Jaguars football